Emmanouil Zerdevas (born 12 August 1997) is a Greek water polo player. He competed in the 2020 Summer Olympics, where he won a silver medal as a member of the Greek team.

Honours
Vouliagmeni
Greek Cup: 2016–17
Olympiacos
LEN Champions League runners-up : 2018–19
Greek Championship: 2018–19, 2019–20, 2020–21, 2021–22
Greek Cup: 2018–19, 2019–20, 2020–21, 2021–22, 2022–23
Greek Super Cup: 2018, 2019, 2020

Awards
Best Greek Goalkeeper of the Year: 2020–21 with Olympiacos
Best Goalkeeper of Greek Championship: 2016–17 with Vouliagmeni, 2020–21 with Olympiacos

References

1997 births
Living people
Water polo players from Athens
Water polo players at the 2020 Summer Olympics
Olympiacos Water Polo Club players
Greek male water polo players
Medalists at the 2020 Summer Olympics
Olympic water polo players of Greece
Olympic medalists in water polo
Olympic silver medalists for Greece
Mediterranean Games silver medalists for Greece
Mediterranean Games medalists in water polo
Competitors at the 2018 Mediterranean Games
World Aquatics Championships medalists in water polo